Pabongkhapa Déchen Nyingpo ,  (1878–1941) was a Gelug lama of the modern era of Tibetan Buddhism. He attained his Geshe degree at Sera Mey Monastic University, Lhasa, and became a highly influential teacher in Tibet. He was unusual for teaching a great number of lay-people. Pabongkha was offered the regency of the present Dalai Lama but declined the request because "he strongly disliked political affairs."

His Spiritual Guide and practice of Buddhism

Ribur Rinpoche described how Phabongkhapa met his root Guru: "His root guru was Dagpo Lama Rinpoche Jampael Lhuendrub Gyatso, from Lhoka. He was definitely a bodhisattva, and Pabongkha Rinpoche was his foremost disciple. He lived in a cave in Pasang and his main practice was bodhichitta; his main deity was Avalokiteshvara and he would recite 50,000 manis [the mantra, om mani padme hum] every night. When Kyabje Pabongkha first met Dagpo Rinpoche at a tsog offering ceremony in Lhasa, he cried out of reverence from beginning to end."

According to Ribur Rinpoche:"Dagpo Lama Rinpoche would teach him a Lam-rim topic and then Pabongkha Rinpoche would go away and meditate on it. Later he would return to explain what he’d understood: if he had gained some realization, Dagpo Lama Rinpoche would teach him some more and Pabongkha Rinpoche would go back and meditate on that. It went on like this for ten years."Pabongkha Rinpoche was a renunciate and eschewed worldly attainments and politics. His faithful attendant once demolished the small old building inhabited by Pabongkha Rinpoche while he was a way on a long tour, and constructed in its place a large ornate residence rivaling the private quarters of the Dalai Lama. When Pabongkha Rinpoche returned he was not pleased and said, “I am only a minor hermit Lama and you should not have built something like this for me. I am not famous and the essence of what I teach is renunciation of the worldly life. Therefore I am embarrassed by rooms like these.”

According to Rilbur Rinpoche,  Phabongkhapa was always gentle and never got angry: "Any anger had been completely pacified by his bodhichitta." Even when long lines of people were waiting for blessings, he would ask each one individually how they were and tap them on the head. Sometimes he dispensed medicine.

His two main spiritual qualities according to his disciples were, from the Tantric point of view, his realization and ability to present Heruka, and from the Sutra point of view, his ability to teach Lamrim. He attributed all his qualities to his own Spiritual Guide, showing him deference throughout his life. Whenever he visited his Spiritual Guide's monastery, he would dismount as soon as it appeared in view and prostrate all the way to the door and when he left he would walk backwards until it was out of sight.

According to one reincarnate Lama who attended his teachings: "He was an exceptionally learned and gifted scholar, and his interpretation of the Doctrine adhered to the meaning of the Lord Buddha's words exactly. He was short, broad-faced, and of rather heavy build, but when he opened his mouth to speak his words had such clarity and sweetness that no one could help being moved." .

Pabongkha Rinpoche was the first Gelug teacher who taught lay persons outside the monasteries and became very influential. In his memoir of his root Guru, Rilbur Rinpoche said:
When he taught he would sit for up to eight hours without moving. About two thousand people would come to his general discourses and initiations and fewer to special teachings, but when he gave Bodhisattva vows, up to ten thousand people would show up.

Phabongkhapa had a profound and far-reaching influence on the Gelug tradition:
Pabongkha Rinpoche was probably the most influential Gelug lama of this century, holding all the important lineages of sutra and tantra and passing them on to most of the important Gelug lamas of the next two generations; the list of his oral discourses is vast in depth and breadth. He was also the root guru of the Kyabje Ling Rinpoche (1903-83), Senior Tutor of the Dalai Lama, Trijang Rinpoche, and many other highly respected teachers. His collected works occupy fifteen large volumes and over every aspect of Buddhism. If you have ever received a teaching from a Gelug lama, you have been influenced by Pabongkha Rinpoche.

In Geshe Ngawang Dhargeyey's commentary to the Wheel of Sharp Weapons, he says: Likewise, Lama Trijang Dorje Chang, Junior Tutor to His Holiness the present Dalai Lama, folds his hands upon the crown of his head whenever he mentions Kyabje Pa-bongkha Rinpoche. He was such a great lama, unsurpassed by any, that hardly any lamas or geshes of the Three Pillars (the monasteries of Ganden, Sera and Drepung) had not been his disciples.

In 1921 at Chuzang Hermitage near Lhasa, Pabongkha Rinpoche gave a historic 24-day exposition on the Lam Rim, or "stages of the path," that was attended by some seven hundred people. Many monks came from the three major monasteries in Lhasa, and many more travelled weeks from the Central Province, from Tsang, and from as far away as Amdo and Kham. This included about 30 lamas and reincarnations of lamas. There were also many lay people present. According to Rato Khyongla Rinpoche, who was present noted: "During that summer session several traders and at least two high government officials found their lives transformed by his eloquence: they forsook their jobs to study religion and to give themselves to meditation."

Zong Rinpoche explains: Kyabje Trijang Rinpoche and Kyabje Ling Rinpoche were tutors to His Holiness the Dalai Lama. They taught His Holiness everything from basic teachings to advanced levels. Kyabje Phabongka passed all of his lineages to Kyabje Trijang Dorje Chang. He often said this in discourses. The purpose of this detailed exposition is to affirm the power of the lineage. If we lose faith in the lineage, we are lost.

According to Kyabje Zong Rinpoche: Once Kyabje Phabongka invoked the wisdom beings of Heruka’s mandala to enter into a statue of Heruka Chakrasamvara. Heruka then offered nectar to Kyabje Phabongka, and prophesied that seven generations of his disciples would be protected by the body mandala of Heruka. Kyabje Trijang Rinpoche is cared for by Heruka Chakrasamvara, as are his disciples.

Position on politics and religion
When the regency of the 14th Dalai Lama was offered to Pabongkha Rinpoche, he declined to become the regent saying, "If one cannot give up the worldly dharma, then you are not a true religious person." According to Goldstein, Pabongkha was quite well known for saying that "lamas should not become involved in politics."

Attempted alliance with Chinese opium warlord
Pabongka attempted an alliance with Chinese warlord Liu Wenhui who controlled the opium trade as well as the Kham region. Pabongka wanted the warlord to be a patron for the Gelug school, to finally ensure its success in Kham:

Deviations from Tsongkhapa's teachings
Dreyfus notes Pabongkha's deviations from Tsongkhapa's teachings:

Sectarianism

Position on the other schools
Pabongka stated that the others schools go to hell:

Phabongkhapa actively opposed the other schools of Tibetan Buddhism. Stephan Beyer writes:

Buddhist scholar Matthew Kapstein echoes these remarks, writing, "There has been a great deal of sectarian dispute among Tibetan refugees in India. Much of this has its roots in the works of Pha-bong-kha-pa Bde-chen snying-po (1878-1937), whose visions of the Dge-lugs-pa protective deity Rdo-rje shugs-ldan seem to have entailed a commitment to oppose actively the other schools of Tibetan Buddhism and the Bon-po."

Regarding Pabongkha Rinpoche's attitude toward the Bön, he said that "The dharmas of Bönpos, tirthikas, and so forth are non-Buddhist and should not be taken as our refuge." In his famous work Liberation in the Palm of Your Hand, he calls it an "evil system", "false dharma", "not worthy of being a refuge", "plagiarized", and "invented". Although the Bön religion was originally highly hostile to Buddhists, Phabongkhapa never advocated intolerance towards them: "Bön is not a refuge for Buddhists; it is not worthy of being a refuge. All the same, Buddhists and Boenpos say things to each other out of attachment or hostility, and this hardly makes for honest debate. It is vital that you should know the sources of the Bön religion." To support his claim that Bön is not a fitting refuge for Buddhists,  Phabongkhapa quoted several Buddhist scholars, including Milarepa who said, "The source of Bön is perverted Dharma. A creation of nagas and powerful elementals, it does not take one to the ultimate path."

Persecution of the Rimé movement
David Kay notes that Shugden was a key tool in Phabongkha's persecution of the Rimé movement:

Ironically the Rimé movement, composed of the Sakya, Kagyu and Nyingma schools, arose in the first place as a result of Gelug persecution.

Controversy
The issue of the assumed sectarianism and persecution of Pabongkha Rinpoche against the other Tibetan schools is highly controversial. Indeed, as stated by Joona Repo in The Treasury of Lives: "While Pabongkha has been accused of sectarianism and even of inciting sectarian violence, specifically in Kham, a number of his own students and well-known lineage descendants, while not denying that cases of sectarian persecution may have taken place, have rejected the allegations that Pabongkha was responsible for these incidents. Pabongkha's writings and accounts of his oral teachings show a unique rhetoric that both esteemed all traditions of Tibetan Buddhism, and simultaneously critiqued  aspects of these (including the Geluk) which he considered  degenerate. He was particularly adamant that Tsongkhapa and the Geluk tradition's understanding of Madhyamaka was exclusively correct and was critical of certain teachings from other traditions which he believed to be corrupt, such as a number of Nyingma treasure cycles. Pabongkha, however, reserved his strongest criticism for the Bon (bon) tradition, which he saw as a corrupt path, plagiarized from Buddhism, which did not lead to liberation. On the other hand, a number of works attributed to Pabongkha contain passages citing the importance of respecting all traditions of Tibetan Buddhism as well as clear statements of respect for specific religious figures from all traditions, such as Padmasambhava, the five founding figures of the Sakya tradition (sa skya gong ma rnam lnga), and Kagyu teachers such as Marpa Chokyi Lodro (mar pa chod kyi blo gros, 1002/1012-1097) and Milarepa."

Construction of Dorje Shugden

Dreyfus states "the propitiation of Shukden as a Geluk protector is not an ancestral tradition, but a relatively recent invention of tradition associated with the revival movement within the Geluk spearheaded by Pabongkha." Pabongkha transformed Dorje Shugden's "marginal practice into a central element of the Ge-luk tradition," thus "replacing the protectors appointed by Dzong-ka-ba himself" and "replacing the traditional supra-mundane protectors of the Ge-luk tradition." This change is reflected in artwork, since there is "lack of Dorje Shugden art in the Gelug school prior to the end of the 19th century."

Pabongkha fashioned Shugden as a violent protector of the Gelug school, who is employed against other traditions. Within the Gelug school itself, Pabongkha constructed Shugden as replacing the traditional Gelug protectors Pehar, Nechung, Palden Lhamo, Mahakala, Vaisravana and Kalarupa, who was appointed by Tsongkhapa.

The abbot of Drepung monastery and the 13th Dalai Lama were opposed to Phabongka's propititation of Shugden, resulting in an apology from Phabongka.

Death
When Phabongkhapa died, an elaborate reliquary was constructed, but the Chinese demolished it. Rilbur Rinpoche managed to retrieve some of his cremation relics ("ring sel") from it, which are usually kept at Sera Monastery. They are on the relics tour of saints and enlightened masters organized by Lama Zopa.

Sources

Secondary Sources

Primary Sources

Notes

References

External links
 The Second Pabongkha, Dechen Nyingpo peer reviewed article by Joona Repo at The Treasury of Lives.
 Lama Zasep Tulku Rinpoche discusses Liberation in the Palm of Your Hand
 Liberation in the Palm of Your Hand (at Google Books)
 Heart Spoon a teaching on impermanence by Kyabje Pabongkha Dorje Chang
 Pabongkha Rinpoche by Buddhist International Alliance.

1878 births
1941 deaths
Lamas
Gelug tulkus
Tibetan Buddhists from Tibet
Rinpoches
Gelug Lamas
Dorje Shugden lamas